Sanja Nedić (born 26 November 1994) is a Montenegrin footballer who plays as a defender for Bosnian Ženska Premijer Liga club ŽFK SFK 2000 Sarajevo and the Montenegro women's national team.

References

1994 births
Living people
Women's association football defenders
Montenegrin women's footballers
Montenegro women's international footballers
KF Vllaznia Shkodër players
Montenegrin expatriate footballers
Montenegrin expatriate sportspeople in Albania
Expatriate footballers in Albania
Montenegrin expatriate sportspeople in Bosnia and Herzegovina
Expatriate women's footballers in Bosnia and Herzegovina
ŽFK Ekonomist players